Kastorny (masculine), Kastornaya (feminine), or Kastornoye (neuter) is the name of several inhabited localities in Russia.

Urban localities
Kastornoye, a work settlement in Kastorensky District of Kursk Oblast

Rural localities
Kastornaya, a village in Mokovsky Selsoviet of Kursky District of Kursk Oblast

References